Dragon Bridge may refer to:

 Dragon Bridge (Ljubljana) in Ljubljana, Slovenia
 Dragon Bridge (Da Nang) in Vietnam
 Dragon Bridge (Sha Tin District) (錦龍橋) on Sha Tin Road, Hong Kong
 A pedestrian bridge (Drakonov Most) in Alexander Park of Tsarskoe Selo, St. Petersburg, Russia